Parchin Bolagh (also Romanized as Parchīn Bolāgh) is a village in Gavdul-e Sharqi Rural District, in the Central District of Malekan County, East Azerbaijan Province, Iran. At the 2006 census, its population was 261, in 62 families.

References 

Populated places in Malekan County